The cabinet of Thein Sein, headed by President Thein Sein, is the first democratically elected government of Myanmar after the military government. It took office on 30 March 2011 after the 2010 Myanmar general election to 30 March 2016.

Cabinet

Cabinet resignations (August 2015)
On 12 August 2015, Minister Tin Naing Thein, Myat Hein, Khin Yi and Than Htay, who will be competing in the November 8 election had resigned, and Lt-Gen Wai Lwin and Lt-Gen Thet Naing Win had moved to their former military responsibilities, replaced by Lt-Gen Sein Win and Lt-Gen Kyaw Swe. On 9 December, minister Ko Ko Oo died and Khin San Yi co-administrated both ministries.

July 2014–August 2015 Cabinet

Cabinet dismissal and resignations (June–July 2014)
On 19 June 2014, Hsan Sint was dismissed from the office of Minister of Religious Affairs and brought to court for corruption. He is the first Minister dismissed openly. He was succeeded by Soe Win, Deputy Minister for Religious Affairs and former Deputy Minister for Ministry of Information. Minister for Information Aung Kyi and Minister for Health Pe Thet Khin were allowed to resign on 29 July 2014. They are succeeded by Ye Htut and Than Aung, Deputy Ministers.

Cabinet reshuffle (September 2012–February 2013)
On 4 September 2012, Pyidaungsu Hluttaw approved the government's reshuffle of ministries, increasing the number to 36, including six ministers located in the President's Office. The President approved the resignation of Zaw Min, Union Minister for Electric Power-1, and Khin Maung Myint, Union Minister for Construction. The President also approved the resignation of Union Auditor-General Lun Maung on 28 August. Thein Hteik, Union Minister for Mines, was appointed as Union Auditor-General, and Lt-Gen Wai Lwin of the Office of Commander-in-Chief (Army) as Union Defence Minister. Wai Lwin was replaced Lt-Gen Hla Min, who was reassigned to the military. During the government's major cabinet reshuffle, nine ministers have been reassigned, mainly with four transferred to the President's Office and one, Aung Kyi, named as the new Minister for Information, replacing Kyaw Hsan, who was transferred to the Ministry of Cooperatives as minister. In the present reformation of the cabinet, Ministries of Electric Power No. 1 and 2 were combined into one as the Ministry of Electric Power, while the Ministry of Industrial Development was abolished.

On 16 January 2013, Minister for Communications and Information Technology, Thein Tun and Minister for Religious Affairs, Thura Myint Maung abruptly resigned. Thein Tun was the first government minister known to have been investigated for corruption under the new government. San Sint, Speaker of Ayeyarwaddy Regional Hluttaw succeed Thura Myint Maung later. On 13 February 2013, former Commander-in-Chief of air force, General Myat Hein become minister for Communications and Information Technology.

This appointments serve as a reminder that most ministers in the government are former officers who played a role in the previous military junta. Since taking office in 2011, the reformist president, who is himself a former general, has selected former senior military officers into government as it simply continues the flawed practices of past military rule, and given only a handful of posts to people without a military background.

Inaugural Cabinet (March 2011) 
The Cabinet was sworn in on 30 March 2011 at the Hluttaw complex in Naypyidaw, after being appointed by President Thein Sein. Four ministers, namely of the Ministry of Defence, Ministry of Home Affairs, Ministry of Foreign Affairs and the Ministry of Border Affairs were nominated by Commander-in-Chief Than Shwe. Two ministries, the Ministry of the President's Office and the Ministry of Industrial Development were created by the Hluttaw (Parliament) on 9 February 2011.

The overwhelming majority of Ministers are Union Solidarity and Development Party members of parliament or military officers affiliated with the former State Peace and Development Council (SPDC), and four are civilians. 12 have previously held ministerial posts, while another 7 have held deputy ministerial posts during the SPDC administration. 3 are former regional army commanders. On 10 August 2011, the cabinet was reshuffled, with Kyaw Swa Khaing, previously the Minister of Industry No. 1 (with Minister of Industry No. 2, Soe Thein, concurrently becoming head of the Ministry of Industry-1), appointed as co-Minister of the President's Office.

Heads and Ministers

Distant Tasks Carried Out 

2011
30 September (Myitsone Dam) – On 30 September 2011, in an address to the parliament, President Thein Sein announced that the Myitsone Dam project would be halted during the term of his government.
 U.S Secretary, Hillary Clinton Visit (1 December) – The United States Secretary, Hillary Clinton visited Naypyidaw and met with Cabinet's head Thein Sein. She is the first US state secretary to visit Myanmar in fifty years.
2012
2012 Myanmar by-elections (1 April) – The UEC held the by-election in April. This make the opponent leader, Aung San Su Kyi and her party members able to the Parliament. Aung San Su Kyi became the representative for Myanmar lower parliament, Pyithu Hluttaw from Kawhmu Township.
At UN Head Quarter (27 September) - The head of the government addressees the 67th United Nations General Assembly at the head quarter, New York.
 Obama First Visit (19 November) – United States President Barack Obama visited to Yangon for one day. He met with Cabinet's head Thein Sein at Yangon Region Parliament. He became the first US president to visit Myanmar.
2013
27th SEA Games – The Cabinet held the 27th SEA Games after 44 years later the last hosted in Yangon in 1969 as 5th SEAP Games.The game was hosted in Naypyidaw, Yangon, Mandalay and Ngwe Saung. The games were officially opened on 11 December 2013 and closed on 22 December 2013 by the VP Nyan Tun. The opening and closing ceremonies were held with the wonderful exploration of fireworks and many volunteers. It can be said the greatest event in Myanmar history. But, the critics said that the million dollar of money spent on the ceremonies are only wasted.
2014
2014 ASEAN Para Games – The ASEAN Para Games was held in January 2014 after the 27th SEA Games. The games were officially opened on January 14 and closed on 20 January by VPs Sai Mauk Kham and Nyan Tun.
9th EAS Summit (12-13 November) – The cabinet hosted the Ninth East Asia Summit.
ASEAN Chairman and ASEAN Summits – The head of the cabinet, Thein Sein chaired the 24th and 25th ASEAN Summits. 24th Summit was held on 4–5 May and the 25th Summit was on 12–13 November. The ASEAN leaders adopted the Nay Pyi Taw Declaration on the ASEAN Community’s Post-2015 Vision and the Declaration on Strengthening the ASEAN Secretariat and Reviewing the ASEAN Organs and the ASEAN Joint Statement on Climate Change at the 25th ASEAN Summit.
2015
Grand Military Review Parade Ceremony(4 January) - The head attended to the ceremony which was held in the 67th Independent day of Myanmar.
Nationwide Ceasefire Agreement(15 October)-The cabinet signed Nationwide Ceasefire Agreement which is a milestone in peace process.

See also 
Cabinet of Myanmar

References 

Cabinet of Myanmar
2011 establishments in Myanmar
Cabinets established in 2011